There are a number of Sand Lakes in Ontario:

Sand Lake (Patterson Township, Ontario) - Parry Sound District
Sand Lake (Swartman Township, Ontario) - Cochrane District
Sand Lake (Olrig Township, Ontario) - Nipissing District
Sand Lake (Chelsea Township, Ontario) - Algoma District
Sand Lake (Muskoka District, Ontario) 
Sand Lake (Leeds and Grenville United Counties, Ontario)
Sand Lake (South Frontenac, Ontario) - Frontenac County
Sand Lake (North Frontenac, Ontario) - Frontenac County
Sand Lake (Kearney, Ontario) -Parry Sound District
Sand Lake (Manitouwadge, Ontario) - Thunder Bay District
Sand Lake (Laurentian Hills, Ontario) - Renfrew County
Sand Lake (Cockburn Island, Ontario) - Manitoulin District
Sand Lake (Head, Clara and Maria, Ontario) - Renfrew Count
Sand Lake (Stoney Township, Ontario) - Algoma District
Sand Lake (Paudash Township, Ontario) - Sudbury District
Sand Lake (Foleyet Township, Ontario) - Sudbury District
Sand Lake (Echum Township, Ontario) - Algoma District
Sand Lake (Val Rita-Harty, Ontario) - Cochrane District
Sand Lake (West Nipissing, Ontario) - Nipissing District
Sand Lake (Strey Township, Ontario) - Thunder Bay District
Sand Lake (Central Manitoulin, Ontario) - Manitoulin District
Sand Lake (Minaki, Ontario) - Kenora District
Sand Lake (Northern Algoma, Ontario) - Algoma District